William Cunningham, 9th Earl of Glencairn (1610–1664), was a Scottish nobleman, Lord Chancellor of Scotland, and a cavalier. He was also the chief of Clan Cunningham.

The eldest son of William Cunningham, 8th Earl of Glencairn, on 21 July 1637 this William obtained a ratification from King Charles 1st, under the Royal Sign Manual, of the original Glencairn Letters Patent of 1488.

He was sworn a member of the Privy Council of Scotland and in 1641 was appointed a Commissioner of the Treasury.

Royalist
The Earl supported the Royalist cause of his King, and in 1643 joined with the Duke of Hamilton and the Earls of Lanark and Roxburgh, in opposing the sending of a Scottish army into England to assist the English Parliamentary Army. For this loyalty he received a (now published) personal letter from the King.

He was appointed Lord Justice General by parliament in 1646. He knew of and is said to have "entered heartily into" the attempted rescue of Charles I in 1648, and was subsequently deprived by parliament of this post on 15 February 1649, under the Act of Classes. The parliament, now being dominant, at the instance of the Public Prosecutor, then passed a Decreet, on 2 March 1650, annulling the original Glencairn Letters Patent of 1488. (This was rescinded at the Restoration).

Glencairn then led an insurrection in the Highlands in 1653 (See: Royalist rising of 1651 to 1654) in favour of King Charles II, when General Monck had possession of Scotland. In January 1654 he was
commissioned by Charles II to command the Royal forces in all of Scotland, numbering some 3,500 men, pending the arrival of General Middleton. The insurrection of that year is generally known as "Glencairn's rising", although he later handed his command to Middleton.
About this time Glencairn and Lieutenant-General Sir George Munro, 1st of Newmore engaged in a duel with both pistols & swords two miles to the south of Dornoch. Munro had poured scorn on the quality of their forces and Glencairn had defended them, challenging Munro, who lost but was only wounded. Middleton initially placed the Earl under arrest, but the Earl left the army a fortnight later.

He was then arrested by Monck in 1655, who later permitted him to return home. Glencairn was excepted from Cromwell's Act of Grace and Pardon.

Restoration
He was one of the peers whom Monck called to the Convention he summoned when he was about to march into England in 1659. It was at this Convention that Glencairn called for Monck to declare for a free parliament.

Upon the Restoration Glencairn waited upon King Charles II at London, when he was again sworn a Privy Councillor and appointed Sheriff Principal of Ayrshire. On 19 January 1661, he was constituted Lord Chancellor of Scotland for life, upon the resignation of the Earl of Loudoun.

Glencairn was Chancellor of the University of Glasgow from 1660, and was one of the principal advisors of the re-establishment of Episcopacy in Scotland. He was not, however, opposed to Presbyterianism, and the subsequent bitter disputes between the two religious factions, and particularly against James Sharp, Archbishop of St Andrews, greatly distressed him and affected his health.

The Earl died at Belton, East Lothian, on 30 May 1663, aged 54 years. According to some sources he was buried, with great pomp, in the south-east aisle of St. Giles Cathedral in Edinburgh, on 28 July following.  He had a daughter, Margaret, who married in 1662, John Hamilton, 2nd Lord Bargany, a descendant of James Hamilton, 2nd Earl of Arran (1517–1575).

According to other sources, he was/is not buried in St Giles Cathedral Edinburgh.   It was not a burial Church but it does contain memorials of other celebrated Scots.  In the old kirkyard, now a carpark, were buried John Knox and William Forbes.

Legend has it that his wife had his head removed and out of love kept it with her. She was buried in the Glencairn Aisle in Kilmaurs and the earls head was buried with her.

Family 

Cunningham married Lady Ann Ogilvy, the daughter of James Ogilvy, 1st Earl of Findlater, in 1637 and they produced four sons and four daughters.

 William, who died at the age of eighteen
 James, who married Lady Elizabeth Hamilton daughter of William Hamilton, 2nd Duke of Hamilton, but pre-deceased his father
 Alexander, who succeeded his father as Earl
 John, who succeeded his brother Alexander as Earl
 Jean, who married William Boyd, 1st Earl of Kilmarnock
 Margaret, who married John Hamilton, 2nd Lord Bargany
 Anne, who died unwed
 Elizabeth, who married William Hamilton of Colestoun

After his first wife died in 1661 from measles, he then married the daughter of Alexander Montgomerie, 6th Earl of Eglinton, Lady Margaret Montgomery. She was widow of John Hay, 1st Earl of Tweeddale. They produced no children.

See also 
Kilmaurs place A property of the 9th Earl of Glencairn.

References
This article incorporates material from a source in the public domain. 

1610 births
1664 deaths
Earl of Glencairn
Members of the Privy Council of Scotland
Lords Justice-General
Lord chancellors of Scotland
Cavaliers
Members of the Parliament of Scotland 1661–1663
Commissioners of the Treasury of Scotland
Chancellors of the University of Glasgow